Gary Bannister (born 22 July 1960) is an English former professional footballer who played for Coventry City (two spells), Sheffield Wednesday, Queens Park Rangers, West Bromwich Albion, Oxford United, Nottingham Forest, Stoke City, Lincoln City and Darlington.

He had a long 17-year career lasting from 1978 to 1995 during which time he made 564 appearances in league and cup matches plus 42 as substitute. Bannister played as a striker, being just 5 foot 7 inches (170 cm) tall and weighing little over 11 stone (70 kg) he relied on his pace and skill to score 199 career goals in all competitions. He made one appearance for the England Under 21 team against Poland in April 1982.

Career
Bannister was born in Warrington, then in Lancashire. He joined Coventry City as an apprentice and graduated through their youth team to make his first team debut in May 1978. He made only 22 appearances, scoring three goals in over three years for Coventry City before moving to Sheffield Wednesday in a £100,000 deal in the summer of 1981. Bannister was a crowd favourite at Wednesday, he was top scorer in each of the three seasons he was there with 22 goals in each campaign. In his first season (1981–82) he was voted Player of the Year, and represented England at under-21 level. In 1983–84 he formed a feared partnership with Imre Varadi; the pair scored 41 goals between them as Wednesday returned to the First Division for the first time in 14 years.

Bannister never played for Wednesday in Division One as he left to join Queens Park Rangers as a replacement for Clive Allen in the summer of 1984. He enjoyed considerable success at QPR, relishing playing on their "plastic pitch" at Loftus Road. He made 168 appearances, scoring 66 goals in his three and a half seasons with them. Highlights were certainly the two hat-tricks he scored against Chelsea. The first came in the 6–0 demolition of their local rivals on 31 March 1986 at Loftus Road and the second in the 3–1 win on 12 September 1987 also at Loftus Road. He returned to Coventry City in March 1988 in a £300,000 deal. His second spell at Coventry lasted two years and was not a great success as he scored 13 goals in 44 appearances before moving to West Bromwich Albion for £250,000 in March 1990 where he stayed until the summer of 1992, making 66 appearances and scoring 19 goals.

Bannister's latter years as a professional included spells at Oxford United (on loan), Nottingham Forest (where, partnering Nigel Clough, he was unable the stop the team being relegated from the Premier League), Stoke City, Lincoln City and Darlington before retiring at the end of the 1995–96 season. He also spent one year (1993–1994) playing for Hong Kong Rangers.

After retiring, he moved to St Ives, Cornwall becoming involved in hotel maintenance and property development. He played for and coached Porthleven in the South Western Football League for several seasons. After about ten years in Cornwall, Bannister and family returned to the Midlands and a job in hotel maintenance in Birmingham.

Career statistics
Source:

A.  The "Other" column constitutes appearances and goals in the Anglo-Italian Cup, Football League Trophy, Full Members Cup and UEFA Cup.

References

External links
 
 Unofficial QPR Hall of Fame
 Sporting Heroes.net
 Lincoln City F.C. Official Archive Profile

1960 births
Living people
Footballers from Warrington
English footballers
England under-21 international footballers
Coventry City F.C. players
Sheffield Wednesday F.C. players
Queens Park Rangers F.C. players
West Bromwich Albion F.C. players
Nottingham Forest F.C. players
Stoke City F.C. players
Lincoln City F.C. players
Darlington F.C. players
Hong Kong Rangers FC players
Porthleven F.C. players
Hong Kong First Division League players
Premier League players
English Football League players
Association football forwards
North American Soccer League (1968–1984) players
Detroit Express players
Expatriate footballers in Hong Kong
English expatriate sportspeople in Hong Kong
English expatriate footballers
Expatriate soccer players in the United States
English expatriate sportspeople in the United States